Basalia melanosticta is a moth of the family Erebidae first described by George Hampson in 1907. It is known from the Palani Hills of south-central India.

Adults have been recorded in August.

The wingspan is 17–19 mm. The crosslines are double, distinct and black at the costa. The terminal line is marked by black interveinal dots. There is a characteristic diffuse, black, oblique streak from the apex of the forewing to the postmedial line at the ventral margin. The terminal line has dark interveinal dots. The hindwing is light greyish and the terminal line brown. The fringes are basally beige and there is an indistinct discal spot. The underside is greyish and brown. The forewings have a well marked antemedial and postmedial line and a yellow costal streak and spots running from the antemedial line to the apex. The underside of the hindwings are greyish with a discal spot.

References

Micronoctuini
Moths described in 1907